Sotto il segno dei pesci is a 1978 music album by Antonello Venditti.

The title track of the album, "Sotto il segno dei pesci", peaked at number-one on the Italian charts.

Track listing

References

Antonello Venditti albums
1978 albums
PolyGram albums
Italian-language albums